B.R. Guest (stylized as "BR Guest") is a collection of fine-dining restaurants owned by Landry's, Inc. By 2015, BR Guest owned 15 large Manhattan places, including five branches of Dos Caminos, two Strip House steak joints, Blue Water Grill and Ruby Foo's.

Business model
Opened in 1987, Hanson signed a partnership deal with Barry Sternlicht, CEO of Starwood Capital Group, as part of its Starwood Opportunity Fund 7 in 2007. The transaction valued BR Guest between $150 million and $250 million.

In August 2010 BR Guest welcomed Alexandre Gaudelet to the team as its new Chief Operating Officer.
 
In November 2016, BR Guest was sold to Landry's, Inc., the operator of many casinos and restaurants including Bubba Gump Shrimp, the Rainforest Cafe, and Golden Nugget Casino.

References

External links
Official website

Companies based in New York City
Restaurants established in 1987
Restaurant groups in the United States